George Rawle (2 December 1889 – 12 June 1978) was an Australian rules footballer who played for Essendon in the VFL during the 1920s. Rawle suffered a severe ankle injury when a boy, and the bone calloused, leading to the foot being badly deformed. Rawle tightly bandaged the injured foot, which enabled him to play.

Family
The son of Hubert Trevillian Rawle (1854-1921), and Annie Maria Rawle (-1971), née Basedahl, George Rawle was born at North Melbourne, Victoria on 2 December 1889.

He married Lillian Charlott Allan (1894-1962) in 1917. Their son, Keith, later became an Essendon premiership player.

Football
Rawle was 33 years old when he made his league debut with Essendon in 1923, the second oldest to debut in history behind his teammate Charlie Hardy. He was a late inclusion in the 1923 VFL Grand Final, making Rawle one of just four footballers in history to play in a premiership on debut after Essendon beat Fitzroy by 17 points. The following season he played in another premiership.

The reason many Essendon players started their VFL careers late was because the likes of Rawle, Hardy and Syd Barker had been with North Melbourne in the VFA and joined Essendon when North briefly disbanded in 1921. Rawle's case was slightly different, he crossed to the VFA club Essendon (A), also sometimes called Essendon Town, (and no relation to the VFL Essendon), and returned to North Melbourne in 1922 as captain-coach before becoming coach of Essendon's seconds in 1923.

His career at North Melbourne had begun in 1911 and he played in their 1914, 1915 and 1918 premierships. 
After he left Essendon he returned to the VFA as captain-coach of Camberwell for their inaugural season.

Notes

References

External links
 
 
 George Rawle, at The VFA Project

1889 births
1978 deaths
Australian people of Cornish descent
Australian rules footballers from Melbourne
North Melbourne Football Club (VFA) players
Essendon Association Football Club players
VFL/AFL Players who played their first game in a Grand Final
Essendon Football Club players
Essendon Football Club Premiership players
Camberwell Football Club players
Camberwell Football Club coaches
Two-time VFL/AFL Premiership players
People from North Melbourne